Tantris is a restaurant in Munich, Germany.  Opened in 1971, it is regarded as one of the best restaurants in Germany. It was voted 44th best in the world in the Restaurant (magazine) Top 50 2009. Chefs have included Eckart Witzigmann and Heinz Winkler. From 1991 till 2020, the chef has been Hans Haas. Since then Benjamin Chmura leads the kitchen.

References

External links
Official Website

Restaurants in Germany
Michelin Guide starred restaurants in Germany
Food and drink companies based in Munich